The secretary of state of Kansas is one of the constitutional officers of the U.S. state of Kansas. The current secretary of state is the former speaker pro tempore of the Kansas House of Representatives, Scott Schwab, who was sworn in on January 14, 2019.

History
The first secretary of state for Kansas was John Winter Robinson, a physician originally from Litchfield, Maine, but who had settled in Manhattan, Kansas, in 1857. Robinson was elected in December 1859, in anticipation of statehood for Kansas, and sworn in after Kansas was admitted to the Union in February 1861.

As a result of a bond scandal, Robinson was impeached on February 26, 1862, along with the governor, Charles L. Robinson, and state auditor, George S. Hillyer. Robinson was convicted by the Kansas Senate on June 12, 1862, and removed from his office, becoming the first state executive branch official to be impeached and removed from office in U.S. history. Hillyer was also removed from office, on June 16, but Governor Robinson was acquitted. Sanders R. Shepard succeeded to the job of secretary of state on July 28, 1862.

In 2015, Secretary Kris Kobach requested and was granted by the Kansas Legislature prosecutorial power in voter fraud cases. In October that year, he filed his first three-vote fraud cases dealing with voting in two states.

Duties

Electoral
The secretary of state is the chief elections officer of the state, administering elections and voter registration throughout the state. The office also receives campaign finance reports and registers lobbyists. The duty of regulating lobbying and campaign finance is shared with the Kansas Governmental Ethics Commission. The secretary was granted by the Kansas Legislature prosecutorial power in voter fraud cases and is the first and only secretary of state to hold that power.

Economic
The secretary operates the Business Filing Center, which registers business entities, trademarks, trade names and liens made pursuant to the Uniform Commercial Code.

The secretary regulates a wide variety of businesses, including sports agents, trade unions, cemeteries and funeral homes.

Administrative
The Secretary's Publications Section is responsible for publishing various legal and informational documents for the state including statutory and administrative law publications such as session laws, regulations and the state's gazette, the Kansas Register.

The secretary also operates "Safe at Home", the state's Address Confidentiality Program and conducts census adjustments.

Officeholders

Territorial

State

See also
 List of company registers

References

External links
 

Secretaries of State of Kansas
1861 establishments in Kansas